Imperia Online JSC is a Bulgarian game production and publishing company founded by Moni Dochev and Dobroslav Dimitrov. Based in Sofia, Bulgaria, the company originally concentrated primarily on browser-based games with their main title being Imperia Online, but later started developing mobile games as well.

On September 21, 2018, Imperia Online became part of Stillfront Group,  a global games company operating through twenty three companies: Imperia Online in Bulgaria, Bytro Labs [de], OFM Studios, 6Waves in Hong-Kong, Sandbox Interactive, New Moon Production, Goodgame Studios and Playa Games [de] in Germany, Coldwood Interactive [sv] in Sweden, Power Challenge in the UK and Sweden, Dorado Games in Malta, Simutronics, Candywriter, Storm8 and Super Free Games in the United States, Babil Games in UAE and Jordan, eRepublik Labs in Ireland and Romania, Everguild in the UK and Spain, Game Labs in Ukraine, Russia, Greece, Dubai, Italy and Estonia, Jawaker in UAE, Kixeye in Canada, Moonfrog in India, Nanobit in Croatia.  Stillfront's games are distributed globally. The main markets are Germany, the United States, France, UK and MENA.

As of January 2023 the company has more 28 games in its portfolio, and has several more in development. Imperia Online JSC now develops games for web browsers, iOS, Android, Windows Phone, Steam and social networks like Facebook, Odnoklassniki and Vkontakte.

History 
Imperia Online JSC was officially founded in September 2009, but the idea for it was born along with its main product - the MMORTS Imperia Online in 2005. Detailed research and crafting of the gameplay, mechanics and programming for the company's main product were done by the game’ and company's founders Dobroslav Dimitrov - Gameplay Designer, and Moni Dochev - Freelance Developer.

In January 2005 an idea grows into a concept and on August 23 Era 1 of Realm 1 of Imperia Online goes live and the story begins.

In 2006 realms of 2 brand new upgraded Imperia Online's versions are officially live. The game is translated into 12 languages thanks to the freelance Community managers and translators the company assigned. In the same year the first of its kind Imperia Online tournament is held - Nomads Invasions.

In 2007 Imperia Online JSC launched Galactic Imperia - a new web-based project with Modern Military context.

Almost a whole year of conceptualizing complicated game mechanics leads to the final publication of Global Wars in March 2008.

In 2009, Imperia Online JSC launched its first role-playing game - Imperial Hero. The RPG was published after a year of conceptual and technical development. Again in 2009 Ludo was launched for iOS and Facebook - the classic turn-based board game now can be played with thousands of real players online.

The next year - in 2010 - Imperia Online JSC launched Online Artillery - a turn-based cannon shooter.

In 2011 Imperia Online's World Cup tournament was held for the first time with the Bulgarian national team winning the first place.

In 2012 the second World Cup was held, won again by the Bulgarians. The medieval strategy got its official appearance in the Apple App Store. The same year Imperia Online JSC was among the exhibitors at On!Fest.

In 2013 the third Imperia Online tournament was conducted and this time it was won by the Croatians. By that time there were already more than 100 people working in the company and the first of its kind school for game developers – Imperial Training Camp - was opened. Throughout the year Imperia Online kept spreading by getting released on iOS and in the largest Russian social network Odnoklassniki. It also became available for Android users. Later that year the newest - and current - version of Imperia Online is launched - Version 6, called ‘The Great People’ with brand new graphic design, enriched and diversified gameplay. Imperia Online JSC was among the exhibitors at Gamescom, Dubai World Game Expo and On!Fest. In the same year the company sponsored Sofia Game Jam, Intergame, Tallinn and the #archHackaton and also the Bulgarian Boogie Woogie Dance team for the World Championship in Moscow, Russia.

In 2014 IO: The Great People is also launched for Android, Windows Phone, and Facebook. Microsoft chose Imperia Online for its ‘Featured’ section in Windows Store. In the second half of the year Imperia Online JSC launched several mobile games, starting with Mad Moles and Online Artillery 2 in August - both of them for iOS and Facebook. Later that year Mad Moles received an Android version as well. In October 2014 Rocket Chameleon was released for iOS and later got an Android version as well. In November 2014 Imperia Online JSC released Egg Tales for iOS,  The arcade game rose to the top of the Bulgarian App Store in the ‘Free’ category. In the meantime - from mid-October until the end of November 2014 the fourth Imperia Online World Cup was held, this time won by Brazil. Imperia Online JSC sponsored the Black Sea Solo Kayak Expedition, HackFMI and is also one of the sponsors of Launchub. That year Imperia Online JSC was among the exhibitors at Gamescom and at Intergame Tallinn where Dobroslav Dimitrov took part in it as a speaker, giving a talk on 'Winning the War for Software Engineering Talent'. Imperia Online JSC is a member of BAIT (Bulgarian Association of Information Technologies) and BASSCOM (Bulgarian Association of Software Technologies).

In 2015 Imperia Online JSC released a number of titles including the RPG Imperial Hero II - a remake of Imperial Hero, launched for Android, Facebook and web. Meanwhile, Imperia Online for Windows Phone was published by Game Troopers and became a featured mobile Xbox title by Microsoft. In January 2015 Imperia Online JSC released the medieval turn-based strategy Seasons of War for Android and later for iOS too. The same month Jolly Join and Golem Wars are launched for iOS. The following month Robo Risk and Cluster Six are launched for iOS and EggTales is launched for Android. In June Imperia Online JSC released Ishi for Android. In October Imperia Online JSC released FlapOTron 3D for iOS and Ludo Blitz, the upgraded version of Ludo from 2009, for iOS, Android and Facebook. The same month the company's COO, Cvetan Rusimov visited Game Connection Paris, where he was a speaker at the conference. The following month Online Artillery 2.0 is launched for Android and released in a 3D Touch Edition for iPhone 6s. In December 2015 Ishi GO is launched for iOS. At the end of the year Imperia Online JSC stepped into partnership with VKontakte and Imperia Online for Android and iOS was integrated into the game section of VK's platform.

2016 started with the team exhibiting at Casual Connect Amsterdam, having an Indie nomination for Online Artillery 2. In April Imperia Online was launched on Steam. In May Imperia Online JSC released the game Viber Emperors for Android and iOS. The game got translated to 30 languages, featured modules like ‘Ask a Viber Friend’ and had its own custom sticker package. In May Ludo Blitz is released in Windows Store. During the summer Cvetan Rusimov, the COO of Imperia Online JSC, took part as a speaker in the conferences Pocket Gamer Connects in Helsinki and Vancouver, Mobile Game Asia and Israel Mobile Summit 2016. Apart from that the company attended Electronic Entertainment Expo in Los Angeles, USA. In November Cvetan Rusimov, was a speaker at Game Connection Paris for a second consecutive year. From the end of October 2016 until mid-December the fifth Imperia Online World cup was held and it was won by Poland.

In the beginning of 2017, in January, Cvetan Rusimov attended the International Mobile Gaming Awards (IMGA) in China where he was a member of the jury. Immediately after that he attended the Mobile Games Forum in UK where he was a speaker. The next month the COO of the company, took part in the 4th GameFounders international investment program as one of the three mentors at Kuala Lumpur, Malaysia. Also that month Imperia Online was the first web-based game to integrate ClanPlay - a social app for better communication for players to use in-game. Meanwhile, the team attended Casual Connect in Berlin. In March Imperia Online JSC stepped into partnership with Play 3arabi - a mobile game publisher focused on the MENA region - releasing Kingdoms Online which is an adapted mobile version of Imperia Online for the Arabic-speaking players in the MENA region. The same month the company's COO, Cvetan Rusimov was one of the speakers at Global Mobile Game Confederation (GMGC) in Beijing. He attended another conference later that month called Digital Games Conference (DGC) in Dubai - where he held another lecture. At the end of March 2017 Imperia Online JSC, partnered with Huawei Company released their game Imperia Online on HiGame - Huawei's android mobile game platform. In April, Cvetan Rusimov was a speaker at Reboot Develop 2017. The COO, Cvetan Rusimov hit another speaking stage at Game Access in Czech Republic. The COO also joined Casual Connect Asia. The studio became part of the 25 most valuable companies income-wise in Bulgaria's IT industry according to a case study in Capital Magazine. Mariela Tzvetanova, CMO at Imperia Online, was one of the key speakers of Israel Mobile Summit, presenting the lecture Beauty and the Beast of Brand Diversification. At the end of June 2017, Cvetan Rusimov, was back on the stage during Pocket Gamer Connects in San Francisco with the session “Why US games can’t copy their own success in China - and how to fix this”. Meanwhile, Mariela Tzvetanova attended Game Development Summit (GDS) and presented: Beauty and the Beast of Brand Diversification. The MMO Game of Emperors was launched on Steam. Later on, in August, the COO, Cvetan Rusimov was a lector at Game Scope and a keynote speaker at Devcom in Cologne - where he held another lecture. In the beginning of September Cvetan Rusimov was a speaker at Dev.Play Conference. During that time the CMO, Mariela Tzvetanova was one of the speakers of Pocket Gamer Connects in Helsinki, presenting "Тop 10 Tips – How To Work With MENA Influencers". In October, as a premium partner of Huawei Mobile, the company was invited to the official announcement of HiApp Europe in Berlin. Right after, both Cvetan Rusimov and Mariela Tzvetanova gave separate talks at Game Connection in Paris. At the end of the year the studio's COO Cvetan Rusimov was a jury for a second time at IMGA China. At the end of 2017 Game of Emperors was launched on Windows.

In January, 2018 Cvetan Rusimov was part of the Prize Judges of Indie Prize at Casual Connect America. The same month the CMO, Mariela Tzvetanova, gave a talk on: 'Social Media Manager vs. Community Manager: What's the Difference?' at Pocket Gamer Connects in London. Later on in February 2018, the CEO, Dobroslav Dimitrov and COO, Cvetan Rusimov attended Mobile Games Forum in London. In March, both CEO and COO, represented the company at GDC and Game Connection in San Francisco. During the next month the CMO, Mariela Tzvetanova and Senior Marketing & BizDev Manager, Anya Shopova attended SheLeader which was held in Sofia. At the end of the month Digital Games Conference in Dubai was attended by the COO, Cvetan Rusimov. In May 2018 Cvetan Rusimov was a speaker at Nordic Game conference. And right after, together with the Marketing & BizDev Team, attended Casual Connect in London, where Game of Emperors was nominated for Indie Prize. At that time Imperia Online is already available on Samsung Galaxy App Store and MI App Store India. In June 2018, the CEO, Dobroslav Dimitrov, was announced as the chairman of BASSCOM. In August the company was present at Gamescom with its C-level and Marketing & BizDev Team. It the end of September the CEO, Dobroslav Dimitrov, was a speaker of Game Dev Summit held in Sofia. Meanwhile, the COO, Cvetan Rusimov, was a speaker at Mobile Growth Summit. In October the Marketing & BizDev Team attended Casual Connect in Serbia where Kingdoms Online was nominated for Indie Prize and our COO was among the speakers at the conference. Meanwhile, the company launched its new publishing program for games. During the same month Imperia Online JSC participated in Sofia Games Night, right before Dev.Play Conference, where Cvetan Rusimov was a speaker for a second year in a row. A week later, the company's COO attended White Nights Conference in Moscow. And after that was also a speaker at Game Connection in Paris where together with the Marketing and BizDev Manager, Mario Vasilev, represented the company with a booth together with Telus International. In October, the COO, Cvetan Rusimov, participated at Huawei Eco-Connect in Rome, Italy. Meanwhile, at the end of the same month until middle of December, the 8th edition of World Cup was hosted, later won by the USA team. Right before the end of the year, Imperia Online was already available on KakaoTalk and One Store for Korea.

In January 2019, the company COO, Cvetan Rusimov, and Marketing and BizDev Manager, Mario Vasilev, attended PGC in London. During the event Mario Vasilev participated in the panel “Managing Your Community Across Platforms”.

Cvetan Rusimov was part of Quo Vadis, Berlin in April 2019. The same month Mario Vasilev was a speaker at GDD in Tallinn.

Imperia Online visited the Webit.Festival Europe 2019 from May 13 to May 15 in NDK, Sofia. Imperia Online JSC was among the exhibitors at Nordic Game expo 2019, Malmo.

The studio heads and biz dev team visited Gamescom. Again in Germany Cvetan Rusimov gave a M&A Masterclass at Baltic Dev Days on September 12, 2019.

Imperia Online's tournament – the World Cup 2019 – opened on September 25. At the beginning of December was announced the winner - Romania.

Imperia Online attended  Pocket Gamer Connects which was held in Helsinki between October 1–2, 2019. Mario Vasilev was a speaker. Mariela Tzvetanova, the CBDO, talked about “Top 10 tips on how to work with MENA Influencers” at Game Connection, Paris 2019 edition. Cvetan Rusimov gave the M&A Masterclass at DevGAMM Minsk 2019 on November 21.

In the beginning of 2020 Imperia Online attended PGC: London where Mario Vasilev spoke about influencer marketing. Shortly after Imperia Online attended the online event: The Gaming San Francisco Online Event where Mariela Tzvetanova, the company's CBDO took part in a discussion. In April 2020, Mariela participated as a speaker PGC Digital#1 where she shared some tips on the Distribution of Free-to-Play Games while Mario participated in a discussion about the right monetization options for your game.

Co-founder & CTO Mony Dochev took part in a Facebook live session with the famous Bulgarian vlogger Kitodar Todorov, where they discussed the gaming industry and Imperia's path to success. During the session Mony presented the new addition to Imperia Online’s portfolio - Siege: World War II. Several other events they attended in Q3 were: Ludicious X, White Nights Summer Conference 2020, Gamescom 2020. Marketing and BizDev Manager Vasil Gospodinov was a speaker at CGC where he reviewed the best practices of monetization for games. The last event of the quarter for the company was attended by Senior Marketing and BizDev Manager Anya Stoyanova, she explored the topic of Influencer Marketing in Eastern Europe at Play2Grow Convention.

In October 2020 Marketing and BizDev Manager, Aleksandar Ivanov, gave a lecture regarding Live Operations and their implementation in their games at GDBAY and  DevGAMM. CBDO, Mariela, opened a discussion on M&A Deals at Dev.Play and gave details and tips about the deal with Stillfront Group. Mariela was also featured on Pocket Gamer.biz in an interview for Imperia Online’s new focus of acquiring game assets.

2020 ended with their participation at PGC and Anya Stoyanova’s ‘10 Must-Know Company Rules by the Imperial Guardian’.

In the beginning of 2021 Aleksandar Ivanov, Marketing and BizDev Manager, shared his presentation about Live-Ops at PGC Digital #5. In February, the CBDO of Imperia Online, Mariela Tzvetanova, was a mentor at Pitchboot Camp Bulgaria, followed by Anya Stoyanova, who gave a lecture on Influencer Marketing at MGS by Mobile Growth Association 2021. Several more events were attended at the same time including Hamburg Games Conference, White Nights Winter and Plovdiv Game Jam. In March, Mariela Tzvetanova participated in Bytro's International Women's Day Panel where the topic was Women in the gaming industry and later was a speaker at PGC Digital #6 together with Marketing and BizDev Manager, Vasil Gospodinov who was a panellist. In May, Imperia Online was certified as a Climate Neutral Company thanks to Stillfront Group who compensated for all its studios' carbon emissions by investing in projects and charities. In June 2021 Imperia Online became fully responsible for the operations and publishing of the first acquired title by Stillfront – Crush Them All, a mobile idle RPG by Godzilab Inc. in 2017. Imperia Online was involved in the search for a suitable title and fully operating it afterwards. Anya Stoyanova presented at Hamburg Mobile Summit the lecture “From Dev to Pub” in July, while Vasil Gospodinov, participated at DevGAMM in Moscow. In the last quarter of the year the company attended PGC Digital #8 with Aleksandar being a speaker and Next Digital edition with Anya also being one. Vasil gave a lecture at White Nights North America, while, Alexandra Zheleva, Marketing and BizDev Specialist, was a speaker at India Game Developer Conference and DevGAMM Fall 2021.

November saw both Anya and Aleksandar presenting at Game Connection Europe and Games Gathering Kiev 2021 respectively, while co-founder and CTO, Mony Dochev, participated in several podcasts at Bulgarian podcast Impact. Imperia Online's 2021 event involvement was capped off by COO, Cvetan Rusimov, who took part in the ‘C-Level Strategy Panel’ at the Israel Mobile Summit.

Imperia Online started 2022 with attending Plovdiv Game Jam, an annual event that brings together game developers to create new games. Shortly after that, the team participated in several other online events - PGC London, Hamburg Games Conference, Mobidictum Business Network #3, followed by the Nordic Games Conference. Right after, Dobroslav Dimitrov, CEO and co-founder of Imperia Online, was invited to an event organized by the embassies of all Nordic countries named ‘Universities of the future & private sector collaboration’. 

In June, Cvetan Rusimov, COO and part of the company's bizdevs, Anya and Alexandra, attended WN Istanbul. Anya was also one of the speakers of the event. Next was Gamescom 2022, attended again by Cvetan along with Aleksandar and Vasil, also part of the BIzDev Team. Right after was Publish Me! Event organized by AppQuantum where Vasil was one of the speakers. Upcoming one was Games Gathering in Bratislava with Cvetan as one of the speakers on stage. 

Later in autumn Anya took part of MGS Africa as an online speaker and was a mentor for ‘Marketing Challenge’ by AUBG. Alexandra took part in the DigiPay Conference and after that together with Mariela, CBDO and Aleksandar attended, with a booth, Sofia Game Night. Mariela had a solo talk at the Hyper Games Conference. Imperia Online’s CEO Dobroslav, took part in Business Tree as a lecturer and talked about personal and career development.

Figures 
 As of January 2023 Imperia Online JSC, has more than 65 million registered users in its main products.
 The company and its games have nearly 650,000 fans across their Facebook pages.
 The annual revenue of Imperia Online JSC for 2017 is 5,3 Million Euro.
 The revenue for the period 2012-2017 is 33,2 Million Euro. And since 2018 Imperia Online is officially part of Stillfront Group.
 The game production company currently resides on 1,200 square meters of office space in Bulgaria's most luxurious office building - Infinity Tower .
 As of January 2023 Imperia Online JSC has more than 70 employees.
 Imperia Online JSC and its products are popular in more than 194 countries.

Games

Training and education 
In 2013 Imperia Online JSC established the first tuition-free school for game developers in Bulgaria. It was originally named Imperial Training Camp and its first season prepared 40 enthusiasts for the professional PHP/MySQL and Java/Android fields. 20 of those 40 graduates were hired by Imperia Online JSC, and the rest were recommended to other software companies.

In 2014 the second season of IO's Training Camp drew even higher interest and this time there were 80 students, divided into 4 groups of 20: 62 graduated, of which 30 were hired by Imperia Online JSC.

For the third season Imperia Online JSC was joined by another Bulgarian company - Trader.bg - and the school was renamed to “IT Talents Training Camp”. By that time the courses are PHP/ MySQL, Java/ Android, JavaScript, Objective-C/iOS, and Java SE / Java EE.  In January 2015 the third season ended with a big part of the 115 participants getting hired.

Every year, there are 180 cadets successfully graduated from the academy. IT Talents Training Camp is already partnering with over 90 companies in the IT industry, to provide them qualified IT specialists. The initiative registers more than 2000 applications per season, from which around 200 most motivated candidates are allowed to enter the intensive 5-month courses. IT Talents is an NGO since 2016 and is provided with Google Ad Grants, enabling free AdWords campaigns. As of November 2017, The Municipality of Burgas organizes a 5-month program in cooperation with IT Talents. The training is again completely free and the applications are done by filling in a short registration form.

Outsourcing 
In May 2015 Imperia Online JSC founded a private company for IT outsourcing called Imperia Mobile Ltd. Till the end of the year the new unit led by Radoslav Gaydarski had already successfully released more than 10 major projects. The outsourcing company offers a full range of services to execute a technical project and overcome any challenges, relying on the full capacity of over 165 professional developers, designers, artists, QA specialists and business developers. In January 2017 Imperia Mobile Ltd. started a rebranding process to the new name of Upnetix, which was completed in April 2017. The company has over 50 released projects and know-how in more than 10 industries. In September 2018, the company was acquired by one of the leading IT companies in Bulgaria - ScaleFocus.

Awards and nominations 
Imperia Online JSC was awarded in the ‘Corporate and Social Responsibility’ Category and nominated for the ‘Education’ Category of BAIT's 2014 Awards.

Imperia Online JSC was proclaimed ‘A Rising Star’ in Deloitte’s Fastest Growing IT companies ranking for 2014 with a growth of 498%.

Imperia Online JSC was nominated in three categories of the 2014 Game Connection Awards:

 ‘Promising IP’
 ‘Desktop Downloadable’
 ‘Hardcore Game’

In February 2019, Imperia Online received from the President of Republic of Bulgaria Rumen Radev a mark of “Excellence in Innovation”.

Imperia Online JSC was nominated for ‘App Developer of 2014’ at The Appsters.

In 2015 Imperia Online JSC was awarded by Deloitte as the 14th fastest growing IT company in Central Europe, having 592% revenue growth from 2011 to 2014. Again in 2015 Imperia Online JSC was nominated in three categories for ‘Forbes Business Awards 2015’:

 Employee of the Year
 Business Development
 Human Resources Development
Imperia Online JSC employee, Ilian Iliev, was awarded 2nd place as Employee of the Year, by Forbes Bulgaria Magazine.

According to the Career Show Index in 2021, Imperia Online was one of the top 50 IT employers (in the 13th place).

Dobroslav Dimitrov, CEO and co-founder, Mony Dochev, CTO and co-founder, Cvetan Rusimov, COO were all nominated for Top 100 IT People by Career Show. The administrative director, Velislav Georgiev was nominated for Top 100 HR People respectively for 2021.

Imperia Online was named amongst the Top 35 most dynamic companies in Bulgaria by Capital for 2021.

Crush Them All was nominated for best Role Playing Game at the TIGA Awards 2021.

In the beginning of 2022, Aleksandar Nikolov, Lead Developer at Imperia Online, was nominated as "Developer on Focus" by Devstyler. 

Right after, Imperia Online has been listed in the Capital rank list for "K100 Fintech and Software", positioning itself at 25th place. 

Siege: World War II was a finalist at the TIGA Awards for "Best Strategy Game" and "Game of The Year.".

Both founders of Imperia Online, Mony Dochev and Dobroslav Dimitrov, together with the COO of the company, Cvetan Rusimov, were part of the Top 100 most influential IT people in Bulgaria by the Career Show’s Index.

References

External links
 

Browser-based game websites
Video game development companies
Video game publishers
Video game companies of Bulgaria